Gabriela Gudelj (born 9 August 1997) is a Croatian handballer for RK Podravka Koprivnica and the Croatian national team.

She represented Croatia at the 2021 World Women's Handball Championship.

References

1997 births
Living people
Croatian female handball players
Sportspeople from Split, Croatia
RK Podravka Koprivnica players
21st-century Croatian women